Simone Baldelli (born 25 October 1972) is an Italian politician from Forza Italia. He is a member of the Chamber of Deputies since 2006.

References 

Living people
1972 births
The People of Freedom politicians
Forza Italia politicians
Forza Italia (2013) politicians
Vice presidents of the Chamber of Deputies (Italy)

21st-century Italian politicians
Deputies of Legislature XV of Italy
Deputies of Legislature XVI of Italy
Deputies of Legislature XVII of Italy
21st-century Italian journalists